Neslihan Bozkaya (born 23 June 2002) is a Turkish-born Azerbaijani footballer who plays as a defender for the Azerbaijan women's national team.

See also
List of Azerbaijan women's international footballers

References

2002 births
Living people
Citizens of Azerbaijan through descent
Azerbaijani women's footballers
Women's association football defenders
Azerbaijan women's international footballers
Azerbaijani people of Turkish descent
People from Hınıs
Turkish women's footballers
Fatih Vatan Spor players
Turkish people of Azerbaijani descent
Sportspeople of Azerbaijani descent